Mateo Daniel Bustos (born 9 October 1992) is an Argentine footballer who current player on Yaracuyanos as an attacking midfielder.

Club career
Born in Malagueño, Santa María Department, Córdoba, Bustos represented Racing de Córdoba as a youth. On 26 February 2013 he made his first team debut, starting in a 0–3 Torneo Argentino A away loss against San Martín de Tucumán.

Bustos was loaned to ADyT Jorge Ross ahead of the 2013–14 campaign. Returning to Racing the following year, he established himself as a starter before signing for Primera B Nacional side Central Córdoba de Santiago del Estero on 14 January 2015.

Bustos made his professional debut on 18 April 2015, coming on as second half substitute in a 2–0 home win against All Boys. His first goal came on 12 June, the game's only in a home success over Gimnasia y Esgrima de Mendoza.

In July 2016 Bustos moved abroad for the first time in his career, joining Uruguayan Primera División club Rampla Juniors. The following 23 January he switched teams and countries again, signing for Portuguesa in Brazil.

On 14 January 2020, Bustos left Nadur Youngsters and signed a contract with Indonesian Liga 1 club Persita Tangerang.

References

External links

1992 births
Living people
Sportspeople from Córdoba Province, Argentina
Argentine footballers
Association football midfielders
Primera Nacional players
Racing de Córdoba footballers
Central Córdoba de Santiago del Estero footballers
Uruguayan Primera División players
Rampla Juniors players
Associação Portuguesa de Desportos players
Maltese Premier League players
Naxxar Lions F.C. players
Nadur Youngsters F.C. players
River Plate (Asunción) footballers
Argentine expatriate footballers
Argentine expatriate sportspeople in Uruguay
Argentine expatriate sportspeople in Brazil
Argentine expatriate sportspeople in Malta
Argentine expatriate sportspeople in Paraguay
Expatriate footballers in Uruguay
Expatriate footballers in Brazil
Expatriate footballers in Malta
Expatriate footballers in Paraguay